The 1955–56 season was Chelsea Football Club's forty-second competitive season. Chelsea began the season as defending league champions and won the FA Charity Shield, but thereafter performed poorly and ultimately finished 16th in the First Division. The club were also due to participate in the inaugural edition of the European Champions' Cup, but withdrew from the competition after pressure from the Football League.

Table

Notes

References

External links
 1955–56 season at stamford-bridge.com

1955–56
English football clubs 1955–56 season